Úrsula Patricia Sánchez (born 15 September 1987) is a Mexican long-distance runner. She qualified to represent Mexico at the 2020 Summer Olympics in Tokyo 2021, competing in women's marathon.

References

External links 
 

 

1987 births
Living people
Mexican female long-distance runners
Athletes (track and field) at the 2020 Summer Olympics
Olympic athletes of Mexico
Sportspeople from Guadalajara, Jalisco
Central American and Caribbean Games medalists in athletics
Central American and Caribbean Games gold medalists for Mexico
Competitors at the 2018 Central American and Caribbean Games
21st-century Mexican women